Greenwich Bay may refer to:

Places
Greenwich Bay (Rhode Island), a bay on the coast of Rhode Island in the United States
Greenwich Bay, a bay at the mouth of the Yarra River in Newport, Victoria
Ships
USS Greenwich Bay (AVP-41), a United States Navy seaplane tender in commission from 1945 to 1966